KXDI (93.9 FM, "I-94") is a radio station broadcasting a country format serving Western and Central North Dakota and eastern Montana from Dickinson, North Dakota (licensed to nearby Belfield).  The station is currently owned by The Marks Group.

KXDI first signed on the air in January 2013. The "I-94" moniker is alluded to Interstate 94, which goes through Dickinson. Since signing on Jan 10, 2013, the station has enjoyed unprecedented success for a startup commercial FM station.

References

External links
 
 

XDI
Country radio stations in the United States
Radio stations established in 2013
2013 establishments in North Dakota